Susan Ursitti (born September 15, 1957) is an American former actress best known for her performance as Boof in 1985's Teen Wolf.

Early life
Ursitti graduated from Saint Mary's College of Notre Dame, Indiana, in 1979, and then spent several years acting in commercials, TV, film, and stage. Her filmography includes Zapped!, Teen Wolf and Defense Play, as well as television guest roles on 21 Jump Street and Charles in Charge.

Personal life
Susan later received her master's degree in Design and Manufacturing. In September 1992, she married Jonathan Sheinberg, the producer of such films as McHale's Navy, A Simple Wish, and The Conscientious Objector. Susan is mother to three children. She is on the advisory board for Los Angeles Parks and Recreation. Susan describes herself as a vegetarian. She lives in Brentwood, Los Angeles.

Filmography

References

External links

Living people
1957 births
American television actresses
American film actresses
Saint Mary's College (Indiana) alumni
People from Brentwood, Los Angeles
21st-century American women